The Cavite Chorale is one among the many Caribbean's chorale singing groups.  Started in 1973 by Kean H. W. Springer (BA, Dip.Ed, M.Phil) as director, Cavite Chorale has been producing music from the Caribbean and beyond to please audiences within the Caribbean and around the world as well.

Located at the Cave Hill Campus of the University of the West Indies (UWI) in Barbados, Cavite Chorale are a student organisation managed under the Guild of Students.  Comprising undergraduates and graduates alike, Cavite Chorale comprises a wide range of voices.

Cavite Chorale engages in a mixture of free and paid performances, with yearly commitments to sing at the UWI graduation and matriculation ceremonies.  Cavite Chorale has performed with the Mighty Gabby, Eddy Grant, Spice & Co., Robert Pilon, and many others.

External links
Homepage

Barbadian musicians